Cocolalla is an unincorporated community in Bonner County, Idaho, United States. The community is served by U.S. Route 95. Cocolalla has a post office with ZIP code 83813.

Notable Person 
Frank L. VanderSloot, Founder and CEO of Melaleuca.

References

Unincorporated communities in Bonner County, Idaho
Unincorporated communities in Idaho